The Evening of My Best Day is an album by American singer-songwriter Rickie Lee Jones, released in 2003.

Track listing
All tracks composed and arranged by Rickie Lee Jones; except "Sailor Song" co-written by David Kalish
 "Ugly Man" – 4:20
 "Second Chance" – 4:53
 "Bitchenostrophy" – 4:38
 "Little Mysteries" – 5:01
 "Lap Dog" – 3:58
 "Tell Somebody (Repeal the Patriot Act)" – 4:04
 "Sailor Song" – 5:00
 "A Tree on Allenford" – 5:13
 "It Takes You There" – 5:17
 "Mink Coat at the Bus Stop" – 4:50
 "The Evening of My Best Day" – 4:15
 "A Face in the Crowd" – 3:43

Personnel
Rickie Lee Jones – vocals, guitars, piano, keyboards, and sitar (on track 4), percussion (4–6, 8), bowed dulcimer (5)
Neil Larsen – piano (1, 6), organ (2, 6), electric piano (3), keyboards (4)
Bill Frisell – electric guitar (1, 3)
Tony Scherr – double bass (1, 3)
Kenny Wollesen – drums, percussion (1, 3)
David Kalish – guitars (2, 4, 6, 10), dobro (5, 6, 8, 9)
Mike Elizondo – bass (2, 5, 12)
James Gadson – drums (2, 5, 6, 10)
Alex Acuña – percussion (2, 9)
Sal Bernardi – harmonica (4, 8), electric guitar (11)
DJ Bonebrake – vibraphone (4)
René Camacho – bass (4, 7, 8, 10)
Cougar Estrada – drums (4, 7)
David Hidalgo – acoustic guitar (7)
John Doan – harp guitar (7)
Craig Eastman – mandolin and violin (7)
Nels Cline – electric guitar and slide guitar (9)
Martin Tillman – cello (9, 11)
Mike Watt – bass (9)
Pete Thomas – drums (9)
Greg Phillinganes – piano (10), organ (10, 11)
Christopher Joyner – Wurlitzer electric piano (10)
Rob Wasserman – bass (10)
Philip Cordaro – acoustic guitar (11)
Mario Calire – drums (12)
Additional vocals
Eric Benét (1, 2), Grant Lee Phillips (3, 8, 9), Ben Harper & the Innocent Criminals (4), Syd Straw (5, 9), James Gadson and Greg Phillinganes (6), Sal Bernardi and Cindy Wasserman (8)
Horns
Dan Higgins – tenor saxophone (1, 2, 4), flute (2, 3)
Jeff Dellisanti – saxophone (2, 4, 9), bass clarinet (8)
Gary Grant – trumpet (1, 2, 4)
Jerry Hey – trumpet and flugelhorn (1)
Bill Reichenbach Jr. – trombone (1)
Phil Feather – English horn (8)

Horn arrangements by Rickie Lee Jones, transcribed by Jerry Hey and Dan Higgins; orchestration for "A Tree on Allenford" by Blair Aaronson
Technical
Jason Wormer, Mark Johnson – engineer
Joe Chiccarelli, Mark Howard, Mark Johnson – mixing

Chart positions

References

External links
Discography at Rickie Lee Jones official web site.

2003 albums
Rickie Lee Jones albums
V2 Records albums